The Annamessex people were a historic Native American tribe from the Eastern Shore of Maryland. Their homelands were part of present-day Somerset County, Maryland.

Along with the Manokin, Nasswatox, and Aquintica, the Annamessex were a subtribe of the Pocomoke people, like the Manokin to their immediate north and the Morumsco at their immediate south. The Nanticoke and Choptank lived north of the Pocomoke, while the Accomac people lived further south in Virginia.

History 
English settlers from the Roanoke Colony made contact with the tribes in this region in the 1580s, while Spanish colonists also explored the area.

The leaders of the Annamessex and neighboring tribes signed a peace treaty with the English in 1678.

On May 6, 1686, leaders from the Annamessex and other Pocomoke people, headquartered at Askiminokonson met with the Land Office Commissioners of Maryland. They reported that British squatters from Accomac Shire, including by Charles Scarborough, had encroached upon their lands and British-owned cattle were destroying their crops. The land office designated a reservation for those tribes.

See also 
 Annemessex Neck, early name for Crisfield, Maryland
 Big Annemessex River

Footnotes

References 
 

Algonquian ethnonyms
Eastern Algonquian peoples
Extinct Native American tribes
Indigenous peoples of the Northeastern Woodlands
Native American tribes in Maryland